Castles was a British soap opera following three generations of a large London family. It ran for 24 episodes on BBC One during the summer of 1995 and was a co-production by the BBC and Granada Television. Its writing team included Peter Whalley who was known for his work on Coronation Street and Sally Wainwright who would go on to create Scott & Bailey and Happy Valley.

Scheduling 
The first episode aired on 31 May 1995 at 7.30pm before settling into what was supposed to be its regular timeslot of Tuesday and Thursday at 8.30pm. Halfway through its run, with audiences averaging 3.2 million, BBC head of drama Charles Denton admitted that the show had not been a success, stating "A piece which sits in the middle of the schedule has obligations to deliver rather fuller levels of audience and enthusiasm than, I'm afraid, has happened with Castles". It was at this point that the series was moved to Monday and Sunday at 7.00pm, where a BBC spokesperson stated "it might better fulfil its potential". Throughout its run, repeats and omnibus editions were aired on weekday afternoons on both BBC One and BBC Two. As the series drew to a close, Radio Times reported that no final decision had been taken about the future of the show, but that writer Whalley was working on a second series. Ultimately, it was not picked up for a second run.

Cast

Episode guide

References

External links

1995 British television series debuts
1995 British television series endings
British television soap operas
1990s British television soap operas
BBC television dramas
English-language television shows
Television shows set in London